Thilo Schmitt (born 1982) is a German slalom canoeist who competed at the international level from 1999 to 2003.

He won a bronze medal in the K1 team at the 2003 ICF Canoe Slalom World Championships in Augsburg.

References

German male canoeists
Living people
1982 births
Place of birth missing (living people)
Medalists at the ICF Canoe Slalom World Championships